Nathaniel "Big Easy" Lofton (born April 15, 1981) is an American basketball player for the Harlem Globetrotters. He and his fellow Globetrotter Herbert "Flight Time" Lang are known for their participation in three seasons of The Amazing Race.

Nate played collegiate basketball for the Southeastern Louisiana University Lions.

The Amazing Race performance

With Herbert "Flight Time" Lang, Big Easy has participated in three seasons of The Amazing Race.

The Amazing Race 15
In their first season, The Amazing Race 15, Flight Time and Big Easy made it to the penultimate leg on a visit to Prague when Big Easy forfeited the Roadblock challenge, finding it too difficult. This ended their season in Leg 11 with a 4th-place finish.

Finishes

 5th (leg 1)
 3rd (leg 2)
 1st (leg 3)
 2nd (leg 4)
 3rd (leg 5)
 6th (leg 6)
 3rd (leg 7)
 1st (leg 8)
 3rd (leg 9)
 3rd (leg 10)
 4th (leg 11/Eliminated)

The Amazing Race 18: Unfinished Business
They returned for The Amazing Race 18, subtitled "Unfinished Business", with their previous elimination cited as their "unfinished business". This time around, the Globetrotters, as they were often referred to in the program, made it to the final leg of the competition. They ultimately finished in 2nd place and lost the one million dollar grand prize and The Amazing Race: Unfinished Business title to Kisha & Jen.

Finishes

 5th (leg 1)
 2nd (leg 2)
 5th (leg 3)
 6th (leg 4)
 6th (leg 5)
 7th (leg 6)
 1st (leg 7)
 2nd (leg 8)
 5th (leg 9)
 1st (leg 10)
 3rd (leg 11)
 2nd (Final Leg)

The Amazing Race 24: All-Stars
The two made their return to the program in the 24th season, an "All-Stars" season, and they had five 6th-place finishes in a row including Leg 8 which their season had come to an end with a 6th-place finish.

Finishes

 7th (leg 1)
 5th (leg 2)
 5th (leg 3)
 6th (leg 4)
 6th (leg 5)
 6th (leg 6)
 6th (leg 7)
 6th (leg 8/Eliminated)

References

1981 births
Living people
Harlem Globetrotters players
Southeastern Louisiana Lions basketball players
The Amazing Race (American TV series) contestants
American men's basketball players
Basketball players from New Orleans